The family Gryllidae contains the subfamilies and genera which entomologists now term true crickets.  Having long, whip-like antennae, they belong to the Orthopteran suborder Ensifera, which has been greatly reduced in the last 100 years (e.g. Imms): taxa such as the spider-crickets and allies, sword-tail crickets, wood or ground crickets and scaly crickets have been elevated to family level.  The type genus is Gryllus and the first use of the family name "Gryllidae" was by Walker.

They have a worldwide distribution (except Antarctica).  The largest members of the family are the -long bull crickets (Brachytrupes) which excavate burrows a metre or more deep. The tree crickets (Oecanthinae) are delicate white or pale green insects with transparent fore wings, while the field crickets (Gryllinae) are robust brown or black insects.

Subfamilies 
The family is divided into these subfamily groups, subfamilies, and extinct genera (not placed within any subfamily):
 Subfamily group Gryllinae Laicharting, 1781 – common or field crickets
 Gryllinae Laicharting, 1781
 Gryllomiminae Gorochov, 1986
 Gryllomorphinae Saussure, 1877
 †Gryllospeculinae Gorochov, 1985
†Araripegryllus Martins-Neto 1987 Crato Formation, Brazil, Aptian ?Weald Clay, United Kingdom, Hauterivian
†Brontogryllus Martins-Neto 1991 Crato Formation, Brazil, Aptian
†Cratogryllus Martins-Neto 1991 Crato Formation, Brazil, Aptian
†Gryllospeculum Gorochov 1985 Dzun-Bain Formation, Mongolia, Aptian
†Mongolospeculum Gorochov 1985 Dzun-Bain Formation, Mongolia, Aptian
†Nanaripegryllus Martins-Neto 2002 Crato Formation, Brazil, Aptian
 Itarinae Shiraki, 1930
 Landrevinae Gorochov, 1982
 Sclerogryllinae Gorochov, 1985
 Subfamily group Podoscirtinae
 Euscyrtinae Gorochov, 1985
 Hapithinae Gorochov, 1986
 Pentacentrinae Saussure, 1878
 Podoscirtinae Saussure, 1878 – anomalous crickets
 Subfamily Eneopterinae Saussure, 1893 – bush crickets (American usage), not to be confused with the Tettigoniidae (katydids or bush crickets)
 Subfamily  Oecanthinae Blanchard, 1845 – tree crickets
 Subfamily unplaced: most extinct
 genus †Achetomorpha Gorochov, 2019 Bembridge Marls, United Kingdom, Priabonian
 genus †Eneopterotrypus – monotypic Zeuner, 1937 Bembridge Marls, United Kingdom, Priabonian
 genus †Fanzus – monotypic Zessin, 2019 Fur Formation, Denmark, Ypresian
 genus †Gryllidium Westwood, 1854
 genus †Lithogryllites Cockerell, 1908 Florissant Formation, United States, Eocene
 genus Menonia  – monotypic M. cochinensis George, 1936 (tentative placement)
 genus †Nanaripegryllus – monotypic Martins-Neto, 2002 Crato Formation, Brazil, Aptian
 genus †Pherodactylus – monotypic Poinar, Su & Brown, 2020, Burmese amber, Myanmar, Cenomanian
 genus †Proeneopterotrypus Gorochov, 2019 – monotypic †P. danicus (Rust, 1999)  Fur Formation, Denmark, Ypresian

References

External links
 
 

Orthoptera families
Ensifera
Taxa named by Johann Nepomuk von Laicharting